Conspiracy of silence may refer to:

 Conspiracy of silence (expression), an expression
 Conspiracy of Silence, a 1951 book, by Alexander Weissberg-Cybulski, also known later as The Accused 
 Conspiracy of Silence (The Avengers), an episode of the 1960s espionage series
 Conspiracy of Silence, a 1989 non-fiction novel by Lisa Priest about the murder of Helen Betty Osborne
 Conspiracy of Silence (1991 film), a Canadian television film
 Conspiracy of Silence, a 1994 produced, unreleased documentary film about the Franklin child prostitution ring allegations
 The Conspiracy of Silence, a 1995 documentary film about domestic violence
 Conspiracy of Silence (2003 film), a 2003 film about Roman Catholic clergy in Ireland
 Conspiracy of Silence, a 2012 eBook in the Space: 1889 & Beyond series, by Andy Frankham-Allen and Frank Chadwick

See also
 Cultures of silence